David Petrasek (born February 1, 1976) is a Swedish former professional ice hockey defenceman who last played with HV71 in the Swedish Elitserien.

Playing career
Petrasek started his playing career with HV71's youth team in 1993. Until the season 1996–97, when he became a regular in the senior squad, he played both with the youth team and the senior team. He was part of the senior squad in the playoffs of 1995 and won the first Swedish Championship for HV71. From 2000–01 to 2004–05 Petrasek was contracted by Malmö Redhawks but returned to HV71 for season 2005–06. In 2008, he won his second Swedish Championship, again with HV71 as an alternate captain for the team. Petrasek's HV71 contract runs through the 2009–10 season.
David Petrasek had 53 points (in 52 games) in 2009–10, the  highest point total of any defenseman in SHL league history.
On July 7, 2010, Petrasek left the Sweden for the first time in his professional career and signed as a free agent to a one-year contract with Belarus team HC Dinamo Minsk of the KHL.

Petrasek is the current record holder for the amount of SHL games played, both for the number of regular season games played and the combined total number of games played including playoff games. He surpassed Mikael Håkanson's regular season record on September 14, 2013, when he played his 809th regular season game. After playing another four games in the 2013–14 season, Petrasek also beat Håkanson's combined record when he had played his 951st SHL game overall.

On March 17, 2016, Petrasek officially announced his retirement.

Awards 
 Swedish Champion with HV71 in 1995.
 Swedish Champion with HV71 in 2008.
 Elitserien playoff silver medal with HV71 in 2009.
 Swedish Champion with HV71 in 2010.

Career statistics

Regular season and playoffs

International

References

External links

Petrasek retires

1976 births
Living people
Sportspeople from Jönköping
Swedish people of Czech descent
Detroit Red Wings draft picks
HC Dinamo Minsk players
HV71 players
Malmö Redhawks players
Swedish ice hockey defencemen